Eileen McGann may refer to:

Eileen McGann (author), American political writer
Eileen McGann (musician), Celtic musician